Turar Ryskululy Ryskulov (Tūrar Rysqūlūly Rysqūlov; Russian: Турар Рыскулович Рыскулов; 26 December 1894 – 10 February 1938) was a Soviet politician, the chairman of the Central Electoral Committee of the Turkestan Autonomous Soviet Socialist Republic.

Ryskulov was born on 26 December 1894 in East-Talgar volost of Semirechensk Province (now Talgar District of Almaty Region), in the family of a nomadic herder. He took part in the Central Asian revolt of 1916 and then in the Russian Revolution in Turkestan and Kyrgyzstan. After the Red Army had taken Tashkent in 1920, he was appointed Chairman of the Central Executive Committee (ie 'President') of the Turkestan soviet republic, which then included all of Russian-ruled Central Asia.   Ryskulov proposed that Turkmenistan should be an independent republic ruled by a Turkic Communist Party, separate from the All-Russian Communist Party. This proposal was overruled by Lenin, who summon Ryskulov to Moscow in May 1920 and persuaded him to abandon the idea. 

In 1921-22, Ryskulov was appointed Deputy People's Commissar for Nationalities, under Joseph Stalin, who was People's Commissar. In June 1923, Stalin accused him of 'pan-Turkism' and of having been a supporter of Mirsaid Sultan-Galiev, the leader of the Tatar communists, who was under arrest. Ryskulov retorted by pointing out that Stalin had himself praised Sultan-Galiev as a devoted communist, before the political situation changed.

In 1922, he returned to Tashkent and was Chairman of the Council of People's Commissars of the Turkestan republic until 1924, when the region was divided into four republics – Kyrgyzstan, Tajikistan, Turkmenistan and Uzbekistan.

In 1924, Ryskulov was transferred to the staff of Comintern and was posted in Ulaanbaatar as chief soviet adviser to the Mongolian People's Party, in which capacity he assisted in the creation of Mongolian People's Republic. In 1926-37, he was deputy chairman of the Council of Ministers of the Russian republic.

Arrest and death 
Ryskulov was arrested during the Great Purge, on 21 May 1937. He was tried and sentenced to death on 8 February 1938, and was executed two days later.

Legacy 
Ryskulov was 'rehabilitated' on 8 December 1956, meaning that the criminal case against him was invalidated, though soviet sources continued to accuse him of 'political errors'. 

Today he is considered a national hero and honored with a large statue at the entrance of Kazakhstan Economic University in Almaty, which was renamed the Turar Ryskulov University. The Turar Ryskulov District and the city of Imeni Turara Ryskulova in Kazakhstan are named after him, and there are streets named after him in all of Kazazhstan's major cities.

References

1894 births
1938 deaths
20th-century Kazakhstani politicians
Great Purge victims from Kazakhstan
National communism in the Soviet Union
Pan-Turkists
People from Almaty Region
Soviet politicians